Pseudopterygium is the conjunctival adhesion to cornea caused by limbal or corneal inflammation or trauma. The pseudopterygium can be easily distinguished from pterygium by bowman's probe test. Because of the lack of adherence of pseudopterygium at every point, the probe can be passed beneath it at some point.

Causes
Chemical burn
 Marginal corneal ulcer
 Cicatrizing conjunctivitis
 Trauma
 Surgery

Differential diagnosis

Treatment
Pseudopterygium can be removed by surgical excision.

See also
 Symblepharon
 Pterygium

Reference

Disorders of conjunctiva